Palpidia melanotricha is a species of moth in the family Erebidae. The species is found in Jamaica.

References

Moths described in 1907
Scolecocampinae